The name poppy goddess is often used for a famous example of a distinctive type of large female terracotta figurine in Minoan art, presumably representing a goddess, but not thought to be cult images, rather votive offerings. It was discovered in a sanctuary of the Post-palace period (LM III, 1400–1100 BC) at Gazi, Crete, and is now is in the Heraklion Archaeological Museum.
 
The name comes from the shape of the terminals of opium poppy seedheads rising from the diadem on the head. Other figures have different ornaments to the head, including many birds, and the Horns of Consecration symbol.  They have a round "skirt", shaped like a vessel, and formed on the potter's wheel, after which the upper body was hand-formed while the clay was still malleable. Some have feet peeping out from under their skirt. They always have raised hands, normally with palms pointing sideways or out, and there is often a hole at the top of the head, perhaps to help firing, while the openings at the ears may be intended to suggest readiness to hear prayers.  Most are unpainted.  They relate to other, less stylized, types of Minoan clay goddess figures.  

In this period, Mycenean influence particularly on art was strong over the island, showing that Crete had become little more than a province of the Mycenean world after the Mycenean invasion in 1450 BC. Minoan pottery figurines were found in public sanctuaries, not only in palace-sanctuaries, as is usual in earlier periods. Clay figurines of the goddess with raised hands also were found in the shrine of double axes in Knossos, in Gournia, in Myrtos, and also in the sanctuaries of Gortys and Prinias. On the heads of the figures there are various religious symbols, such as horns of consecration, diadems, birds, and the seeds of opium poppies. The female figure known popularly as the poppy goddess is perhaps a representation of the goddess as the bringer of sleep or death.

The figurines found at Gazi, which are larger than any previously produced on Minoan Crete, are rendered in an extremely stylized manner. The bodies are rigid, the skirts simple cylinders, and the poses stereotyped.

Religious significance
Interpreters speculate that the raised hands of the figurine who gazes toward the visitor indicate that it is a deity and that the gesture of the two upraised hands with open palms is an epiphany gesture of the goddess. It is possible that the goddess is giving a greeting, or a blessing, or is praying, or it may symbolize her appearance in earth in human form.
 
Poppies were mentioned in Greco-Roman myths as offerings to the dead. Robert Graves believed that a second meaning of the depiction and use of poppies in the Greco-Roman myths is the symbolism of the bright scarlet colour as signifying the promise of resurrection after death and that the poppy was the emblem of the goddess Demeter. According to Theocritus for the Greeks Demeter was a poppy goddess bearing sheaves and poppies in both hands (Idyll vii 157).

Karl Kerenyi asserted that poppies were connected with a Cretan cult that was transmitted to the Eleusinian Mysteries in Classical Greece: "It seems probable that the Great Mother Goddess who bore the names Rhea and Demeter, brought the poppy with her from her Cretan cult to Eleusis and it is almost certain that in the Cretan cult sphere opium was prepared from poppies."

Fellow British classicist and scholar, Jane Ellen Harrison shares the view that the imagery of the gathered poppy reeds in the figurine's hands are associated with the Minoan/Cretan "Mother of the Gods".

See also
Great Goddess
Poppy (botany)

References

Hood, Sinclair, The Arts in Prehistoric Greece, 1978, Penguin (Penguin/Yale History of Art),

External links
  mekon (poppy): Theoi project

2nd-millennium BC sculptures
Figurines
Terracotta sculptures
Archaeological discoveries in Greece
Minoan archaeological artifacts
Minoan art
Minoan religion
Sculptures of goddesses
Votive offering
Heraklion (regional unit)
Poppy seeds
Opium culture